The Ricoh GR Digital is a compact digital camera made by Ricoh since 2005.

First announced at photokina 2004, it went on sale in Japan on 21 October 2005. The GR Digital is Ricoh's digital successor to their 35 mm GR series film cameras and the first in a series of Ricoh GR digital cameras.

Unlike most similar cameras, it lacks a zoom lens, instead having a fixed focal length of 5.9 mm (or 28 mm, in 35 mm full frame equivalent).

1st Anniversary Limited Edition 
The GR 1st Anniversary Limited Edition of 2006 has a body covered with a blue sky and clouds, and drawings of angels, by Katsuya Terada. Production was limited to 1000 cameras worldwide. It is functionally identical to the standard GR D except for the startup/shutdown screens.

See also
Point-and-shoot camera
Wide-angle lens

References

External links

Ricoh digital cameras